Tisted was a railway station on the Meon Valley line which served the village of East Tisted. It opened in 1903 and closed in 1955. The main station building, designed by T. P. Figgis, is now a private residence.

Closure
The last train, pulled by two T9 class locomotives (30301 and 30732), left on 6 February 1955.

The site today
The station building survived the closure and is now a private residence.

Route

Notes

Disused railway stations in Hampshire
Former London and South Western Railway stations
Railway stations in Great Britain opened in 1903
Railway stations in Great Britain closed in 1955